Swiftair Hellas is a cargo airline based in Athens, Greece. Its main base is Athens International Airport and it mainly serves the Greek domestic market.

History 

Mediterranean Air Freight was established and started operations in June 2003. It is wholly owned by Swiftair.

Fleet 
The Swiftair Hellas fleet includes the following aircraft (at March 2007):

3 Fairchild Metro III
1 Fairchild Metro 23

References 

Airlines of Greece
Cargo airlines
Airlines established in 2003
Greek companies established in 2003